Deathbound was a death metal band from Vaasa, Finland. They formed in 1995 and split up in 2010. They were signed to Dynamic Arts Records and released four albums while active, the most recent being Non Compos Mentis (2010).

History
Deathbound formed in 1995 under the name of Twilight. They released two demos under this name, Twilight and Melancholy of Northern Landscapes. After this, they changed their name to Unbound and released another demo, Flames of Madness. A further name changed saw their name finally stick on Deathbound. Under this name they released one more demo, Elaborate the Torture. The band signed to Woodcut Records and released their first album, To Cure the Sane with Insanity. The band then signed to Dynamic Arts Records and recorded a split album with death metal band Deathchain. The band then went on to release their second album, this time with record label Dynamic Arts Records, entitled Doomsday Comfort, featuring the guest vocals of Mieszko Talarczyk, vocalist and guitarist of Swedish grindcore band Nasum. This was the last project Mieszko worked on before his death during the 2004 Indian Ocean earthquake. Deathbound released their third album, We Deserve Much Worse, in 2007, and their fourth album, Non Compos Mentis, in 2010.

Members
 Final lineup
 Petri "Pete" Seikkula – guitar (1995–2010)
 Kai Jaakkola – vocals (1995–2010)
 Sami Latva – drums (2003–2010)

 Former
 Tommy "Kuntz" Konu – bass (1995–2003)
 Fredrik Andersson (II) – guitar (1998–1999)
 Nicklas Sundqvist – guitar (1999–2000)
 Mikael Sandorf – drums (2000)
 Mika Aalto – drums, bass (2002–2003, 2004)
 Hannu Teppo – bass (2003–2004)
 Heikki Järvi – bass (2005–2006)
 Toni Pihlaja – bass (2006–2009)

Discography

As Twilight

Demos
 Twilight (1995)
 Melancholy of Northern Landscapes (1995)

As Unbound

Demos
 Flames of Madness (1999)

As Deathbound

Albums
 To Cure the Sane with Insanity (2003)
 Doomsday Comfort (2005)
 We Deserve Much Worse (2007)
 Non Compos Mentis (2010)

Splits
 Deathbound/Deathchain Split (2005)

Demos
 Elaborate the Torture (2000)

External links
 
 Deathbound's page at Dynamic Arts Records
 [ Deathbound at Allmusic]

  

Finnish death metal musical groups
Musical groups established in 1995